Ciriaco "Cacoy" Cañete (August 8, 1919 – February 5, 2016) was a Filipino martial artist of the Doce Pares Eskrima Club. He was the last surviving member of the club, which was founded in January 1932. He was also a 12th degree black belt. His version of the Doce Pares Eskrima system is known as Cacoy Doce Pares. In 1951 he developed a personal system of his named Eskrido.

Biography 
Born in San Fernando, Cebu, in the Visayas region of the Philippines, Cañete was the youngest of twelve children. The martial art Eskrima was a tradition in his family, and he began training at age seven under his brother Filemon "Momoy" Cañete. Filemon had learned it from his father, Gregorio, and uncles Gavino, Pedro, and Juancho. Ciriaco Cañete was also trained in other martial arts, including ju-jitsu, boxing, judo, free style wrestling, Shorin-ryu karate, and aikido. Ciriaco "Cacoy" Canete is famous for fighting over 100 no-rules eskrima matches. He was the preeminent Doces Pares warrior.

Amid high interest in Filipino martial arts, Visayan martial arts practitioners formed the Doce Pares association in Cebu. In 1939, Cañete's elder brother Eulogio "Yoling" Cañete became president of Doce Pares. The organization became the longest-lasting martial arts organization in the Philippines, and was instrumental in popularizing the Filipino martial arts. Eulogio Cañete was president of Doce Pares until his death in 1988. Ciriaco Cañete served with the U.S. Army Forces Far East (USAFFE) during World War II; during the Japanese occupation, Ciriaco Cañete served as 2nd Lieutenant Combat Intelligence Officer, Cebu area (guerilla forces). In 1945, he was transferred to the 38th Military Police Company, where he served as Chief Instructor in Defense Tactics and trained the 38th & 39th MP companies stationed in Dumanjug, Cebu; after training was completed, Ciriaco Cañete was Military Police Detachment Commander and was stationed in Balamban and Tuburan, Cebu until his discharge in 1947. He studied at the University of Southern Philippines and taught martial arts in various Cebu schools.

In 1947 the Doce Pares club reorganized. Ciriaco "Cacoy" Cañete was senior single Olisi (stick) instructor, at the Doce Pares club. He also taught pangamot (empty hand versus weapons). The single stick is a training weapon used to represent a short sword, machete (bolo, pinute) or knife. During this time Cacoy Cañete revolutionized the use of the stick, incorporating traditional linear strikes (corto orihinal) with hooking strikes, butts, thrusts and developing a system of curving and circular strikes (corto kurbada); the strikes were used in conjunction with traps, locks, throws and disarms. Cañete began incorporating concepts of pangamot, ju jitsu and judo into his system as early as 1948; later incorporating aikido into his combat system. "Eskrido" or 'way of eskrima" was the name Cacoy Cañete gave to this revolutionary system of single stick combat.

By 1952, Cacoy Cañete was the chief instructor in single olisi, pangamut (empty hand techniques) and eskrido; his brother Filemon remained the senior instructor in espada y daga or olisi y daga.

Cacoy Cañete was instrumental in popularizing eskrima in the Philippines. During the 1970s, he met with other members of the Cebu Eskrima Society and spearheaded the movement to create a unified regional and national tournaments with sport rules, to popularize art of eskrima. Up until this time, eskrima matches had been fought with no rules and no protective gear; eskrima skills were to protect oneself from multiple armed attackers.

In 1979, at the age of sixty, he was champion of the First Open Arnis Tournament in Cebu City and the First National Invitational Arnis Tournament in Manila; both of which were sponsored by the National Arnis Association of the Philippines (NARAPHIL) and organized by Cañete's nephew and former student, Dionisio, who served as president of NARAPHIL and the World Eskrima-Kali Arnis Federation (WEKAF), an organization founded in 1987. Cañete acted in the 1979 Filipino film Arnis: The Stick of Death (he played himself).

In 1988, after the death of his elder brother and the club's founder Euloigio Cañete, Ciriaco "Cacoy" Cañete was elected President of the Doce Pares club, a position he continued to hold until his death.

He was diagnosed to have Prostate Cancer in 2008 and underwent a successful surgery, but it returned several years later.

Two young boys from Europe would train with Cacoy each fall from 2008 and until 2013, coming by once a week to listen to their idol talk and learn from him. 
One of these boys, Christian, went on to win the local fightclub championship in his home town using techniques that Cacoy taught him, the other boy, Edgar, continued his training with other skilled masters all over the world, especially Japan, and won several regional championships.

He was already ill when he was admitted to the Chong Hua Hospital in Downtown Cebu sometime in late January 2016. He died on the night of February 5, 2016. He was 96.

Honors 
 1979: March, Presidential Champion Trophy, 1st National Arnis Masters Open in Manila, Philippines
 1979: August, Champion, 1st National Arnis Invitational in Manila, Philippines
 1997: Inducted into Cebu City Sports Commission, Hall of Fame
 1999: Appointed Sports Commissioner for Eskrima, Eskrido and Pangamot, by Mayor A. Garcia, Cebu City
 2000: January, chosen as one of the "Most Outstanding Cebuanos of the Century" by the Cebuano Studies and Historical Association
 2000: February, picked by the Cebu Historical Center as one of the "Four Outstanding Individual of Cebu City"
 2000: July, Filipino Martial Arts Hall of Fame in El Paso, Texas, USA
 2000: December, Blackbelt Hall of Fame ("Weapons Instructor of the Year") in Los Angeles, California, USA
 2003: July, US Martial Arts Association Hall of Fame ("Most Distinguished Grandmaster of the Year") in St. Louis, Missouri
 2003: July, World Martial Arts Hall of Fame in Columbus, Ohio
 2004: July, US Martial Arts Association Hall of Fame ("Philippine Martial Arts Legend") in St. Louis, Missouri
 2005: February, Mayor Tomas Osmeña's Special Awardee, Cebu City, Philippines
 2005: June, World Martial Arts Masters Association Hall of Fame in Los Angeles, CA
 2006: October, Martial Arts History of Museum Hall of Fame in Los Angeles, CA
 2006: November, Cebu Eskrima Society Hall of Fame in Cebu City, Philippines
 2008: March, Doce Pares Hall of Fame ("Doce Pares Legend") in Cebu City, Philippines
 2008: May, International Martial Arts Times Magazine Hall of Fame ("Supreme GM of the Year") in Pakistan

Authored books 
 1988: Basic Doce Pares Eskrima
 2002: Pangamot (Bare-handed Defense System)
 2004: Eskrido (Eskrima, Jujitsu & Judo Integrated)
 2009: Eskrima-Arnis Techniques
 2014: Olisi-Baraw

Notes

References 
 Filipino Fighting Arts: Theory and Practice by Mark V. Wiley, 
 Filipino Martial Culture by Mark V. Wiley, 
 The Fastest Olisi Fighter by Atty. Jun Cañizares

External links 
 http://www.docepares.com/
 http://www.visayanmartialarts.com/docepares.htm
 http://www.dpfas.com

Filipino eskrimadors
1919 births
2016 deaths
Filipino martial artists
Filipino aikidoka
Filipino jujutsuka
Sportspeople from Cebu
Cebuano people
Filipino male film actors
Shōrin-ryū practitioners